Neurotica was a quarterly magazine founded Jay Landesman in New York City in 1948. It was edited by Jay Irving Landesman except volume 9 which was edited by Gershon Legman who also served as Associate Editor for volume 5. The magazine became an outlet for the Beat Generation of writers. The first issue of the magazine published in Spring 1948. It described itself as a magazine written by neurotics, for neurotics. Neurotica ended publication in 1951. 
Neurotica served as an outlet for young writers and gained a reputation for publishing edgy material dealing with sex, the arts and neuroticism. Contributors included among many, John Clellon Holmes, Leonard Bernstein, Marshall McLuhan, Allen Ginsberg, Lawrence Durrell, Henri Michaux and even a poem from F. Scott Fitzgerald. An anthology was published in 1963 and remains collectible.

References

Defunct literary magazines published in the United States
Magazines established in 1948
Magazines disestablished in 1951
Magazines published in New York City
Quarterly magazines published in the United States